En Magan is a 1974 Indian Tamil language film directed by C. V. Rajendran. The film stars Sivaji Ganesan and Manjula, with K. Balaji, Major Sundarrajan, R. S. Manohar, V. S. Raghavan, V. K. Ramasamy and Manorama in supporting roles. It is a remake of the 1972 Hindi film Be-Imaan. The film was commercially successful.

Plot

Cast

Soundtrack 
The music was composed by M. S. Viswanathan, with lyrics by Kannadasan.

References

External links 
 

1970s Tamil-language films
1974 films
Films directed by C. V. Rajendran
Films scored by M. S. Viswanathan
Tamil remakes of Hindi films